Petrophila leucistis is a moth in the family Crambidae. It was described by Paul Dognin in 1906. It is found in Ecuador.

References

Petrophila
Moths described in 1906